Katira is a district of the Guatuso canton, in the Alajuela province of Costa Rica.

History 
Katira was created on 19 November 2008 by Decreto Ejecutivo 34913-MG.

Geography 
Katira has an area of  km² and an elevation of  metres.

Demographics 

For the 2011 census, Katira had a population of  inhabitants.

Transportation

Road transportation 
The district is covered by the following road routes:
 National Route 4

References 

Districts of Alajuela Province
Populated places in Alajuela Province